The Women's 25K race at the 2006 FINA World Open Water Swimming Championships was swum on Saturday, September 2, 2006 in Naples, Italy. It was the fifth event of the 2006 Open Water Worlds. 13 females were entered in the event, 12 of whom swam.

Results
All times in hours : minutes : seconds

See also
2004 FINA World Open Water Swimming Championships – Women's 25K
Open water swimming at the 2007 World Aquatics Championships – Women's 25 km
2008 FINA World Open Water Swimming Championships – Women's 25K

References

Fina World Open Water Swimming Championships - Women's 25k, 2006
World Open Water Swimming Championships